Peter Kyobe Waiswa (born 29 August 1971) is a Ugandan researcher, medical doctor and academic administrator. He is an associate professor of Health Policy, Planning and Management at Makerere University. Waiswa is a health policy and health systems expert with a special interest in maternal, newborn and child health in low and middle-income countries.

Early life and education
Waiswa was born a twin on 29 August 1971 to the late Kyobe Kasiko Isabirye and Gladys Kasiko Nabirye of Naigobya village, Bukooma sub-county in Luuka District. He attended Iganga Town Council Primary School then went to Budini Secondary School for O'level and Jinja College for A'level. In 1992 he was enrolled at Mbarara University, Uganda graduating with a Bachelor of Medicine and surgery. His Masters degree in public health from Hebrew University of Jerusalem Braun School of Public Health and Community Medicine. His joint PhD in Medicine & post doctoral fellowship from Makerere University and Karolinska Institute, in Sweden. Waiswa is a Visiting Researcher at the Karolinska Institute, Sweden.

Career
Waiswa did his medical internship at Rubaga Missionary hospital in Kampala (1997–98) after which he worked as National First Aid Officer of the Uganda Red Cross (1999-2000), then as a doctor and assistant district medical officer for Iganga District. He was hired by Makerere University, serving in the Department of Health Policy, Planning and Management for the School of Public Health, College Of Health Sciences since 2008 until now. He is a founder and member of an NGO Uganda Development and Health Associates (UDHA) and One Village At A Time (OVAAT). He also founded and leads the research groups of The INDEPTH Network Maternal, Newborn & Child Health Working Group (MNCH-WG) and The Makerere University Centre of Excellence for Maternal Newborn & Child Health also a member of the Uganda National Immunisation Technical Advisory Group. He regularly participates as a technical advisor for various local, national, regional and international organisations including WHO, UNICEF, The Bill & Melinda Gates Foundation, International Pediatric Association, African Academy of Sciences.

Other consideration
He is favorably cited with an H-Index of 35 and has thus far published research findings in over 120 peer-reviewed journal Scientific publications. In May 2020, Waiswa was appointed on the World Health Organization Strategic and Technical Advisory Group of Experts (STAGE) for Maternal, Newborn, Child and Adolescent Health and Nutrition.

References

External links
Peter Waiswa | Makerere University School of Public Health - Academia.edu
Peter Waiswa at WHO

1971 births
Living people
Ganda people
Ugandan academics
Ugandan Roman Catholics
Academic staff of Makerere University
Mbarara University alumni
People from Central Region, Uganda
Fellows of Uganda National Academy of Sciences
Hebrew University-Hadassah Braun School of Public Health and Community Medicine alumni